The Tamil Literary Garden, is a Canadian literary organization and charity founded in 2001. The focus of this organization is on supporting translations of Tamil literature, sponsoring lecture series, commissioning publications, launching books and recognizing annually significant achievements in Tamil in a number of genres and fields.

Over a span of a few years, the activities grew to include a number of awards, such as the best work of fiction, non-fiction and poetry for the year. Translation award and Information technology in Tamil award were added on subsequently. A scholarship for a student essay submitted in English by an undergraduate or graduate student in Ontario was also introduced. In order to make the process both rigorous and transparent, a number of advisors and an international panel of judges were included.

On 3 March 2010, the Tamil Literary Garden was accepted as a charitable organization. Currently 22 volunteers take part in its activities on a regular basis assisted by the board members and none receives any financial compensations. The financial statements are being audited by a firm of Chartered Accountants.

Its founding members include Chelva Kanaganayakam, Appadurai Muttulingam, Kandiah Mahalingam, Selvam Arulanandam, and Sivakumaran Subramaniyam.

Awards

Iyal award

Iyal award is a Lifetime Achievement Award, given annually to a writer, scholar, critic or editor, who, over a period of time, has made a very significant contribution to the growth or study of Tamil literature. Every year, the Tamil Literary Garden sends out a call for nominations internationally.

The nominations are reviewed by an international panel of judges who determine the winner for the year. The recipient is invited to the annual awards ceremony in Toronto where he or she is given the award that includes a cash prize of C$2,500. The Lifetime Achievement Award in Tamil is the only one of its kind anywhere in the world and is similar to other prestigious awards given in Canada, USA and U.K. It is open to all, regardless of nationality, race, ethnicity, religion, or gender.

Fiction Award

Non-Fiction Award

Poetry Award

Translation Award

Information Technology in Tamil Award

Foreign Language Award

Special Recognition Awards

Apart from the yearly awards, Special Recognition Awards are given on ad-hoc basis for outstanding contributions to Tamil Literature. So far three such awards were given.

Dec 2006: A.J.Canagaratne, born in Jaffna, Sri Lanka is a great intellect and his most important contribution to Tamil literature is literary criticism. He gave new direction to the growth of literature in Sri Lanka and elsewhere.

July 2010: Sascha Ebeling, Asst Professor, University of Chicago, U.S.A is a researcher in Tamil language and literature of all periods, in particular 19th century culture and Tamil epigraphy. His work on 19th century Tamil literature has won two awards.

July 2013: Mr. & Mrs. Aseervatham, This award is given for the commitment to Tamil and the sponsorship of Tamil Literary Garden.

July 2015: So. Pathmanathan and Brenda Beck

July 2016: Dr. David Shulman in honour of All Teachers of the World

July 2016: Ira Ilangkumaran

June 2017: Sivakumaran Subramaniam (Chezhian)

June 2017: T. Gnanasekaran in honour of All Teachers of the World

June 2017: Dr. Nicholapillai Marier Xavier

June 2018: Navin Manogaran

June 2018: S. Thiruchelvam

2020:  P.J.Dilipkumar

2020:  Veerakathy Suthershan

Scholarship Award

The scholarship award was established in 2008 in order to encourage and promote Tamil Studies in the diaspora, particularly among the second generation.

Nominations

Nomination forms are available in the website. It can be applied for self or others before 31 October of every year.

See also
 Appadurai Muttulingam
 Jeyamohan
 S.Ramakrishnan

References

External links
ValaiTamil.com - Tamil Largest Literary Garden
The Tamil Literary Garden
Tamil Literary Garden on Vimeo
Tamil Literary Garden - YouTube channel
Speech by Jeyamohan as Special Guest
Article about Tamil Literary Garden in Toronto Star

Tamil diaspora
Tamil-language literature
Indo-Canadian organizations
Ethnic organizations based in Canada